German submarine U-83 was a Type VIIB U-boat of Nazi Germany's Kriegsmarine during World War II.

She was laid down in the Flender Werke at Lübeck as yard number 291 on 5 October 1939. Launched on 9 December 1940, she was commissioned on 8 February 1941. U-83 served with 1st U-boat Flotilla from 8 February 1941 to 31 December, with the 23rd flotilla from 1 January 1942 to 30 April and with the 29th flotilla from 1 March 1942 until she was sunk.

Design
German Type VIIB submarines were preceded by the shorter Type VIIA submarines. U-83 had a displacement of  when at the surface and  while submerged. She had two shafts and two  propellers.

Differently from other VII B U-Boats, U-83 was fitted with only the front four   torpedo tubes, and only twelve instead of 14 torpedoes, one  SK C/35 naval gun, 220 rounds, and one  anti-aircraft gun The boat had a complement of between forty-four and sixty.

Service history

U-83 was sunk on 4 March 1943 with all hands southeast of Cartagena in Spain in position , by three depth charges dropped from an RAF Hudson bomber (500 Squadron).

Wolfpacks
U-83 took part in three wolfpacks, namely:
 Bosemüller (28 August - 2 September 1941) 
 Seewolf (2 – 7 September 1941) 
 Breslau (2 – 29 October 1941)

Summary of raiding history

See also
 Mediterranean U-boat Campaign (World War II)

References

Notes

Citations

Bibliography

External links

German Type VIIB submarines
U-boats commissioned in 1941
U-boats sunk in 1943
U-boats sunk by British aircraft
World War II submarines of Germany
World War II shipwrecks in the Mediterranean Sea
1940 ships
Ships built in Lübeck
U-boats sunk by depth charges
Ships lost with all hands